Strelets is a term used to refer to a Russian infantryman from the 16th to the early 18th centuries.

Strelets may also refer to:

Bulgaria 
 Strelets, Stara Zagora Province, a village in the Stara Zagora Municipality, Stara Zagora Province
 Strelets, Veliko Turnovo Province, a village in the Gorna Oryahovitsa Municipality, Veliko Turnovo Province

Hungary 
 singular of Streltsy (Hungary), historical border guards in Őrség

Russia  
 Russian monitor Strelets, a warship built for the Imperial Russian Navy in the mid-1860s
 a truck-mounted variant of the 9K38 Igla surface-to-air missile system
 Strelets (military reconnaissance), a reconnaissance, control, and communications system of the Russian Armed Forces
 Strelets, Lipetsk Oblast, a village in Dolgorukovsky District, Lipetsk Oblast

Ukraine 
 Strelets Arab, an extinct breed of horse

bg:Стрелец
bs:Strijelac (čvor)
cs:Střelec
hr:Strijelac
sk:Strelec